ABC Midwest & Wheatbelt is an ABC Local Radio station based in Geraldton.  The station broadcasts to the Mid West and Wheatbelt regions of Western Australia.  This includes the towns of Meekatharra Northam and Dalwallinu.

The station broadcasts through three main AM transmitters. 6GN on 828 AM, 6NM on 1215 AM and 6DL on 531 AM.  There are also a number of low power FM transmitters.

When local programs are not broadcast the station is a relay of 720 ABC Perth.

The station has a breakfast show presented by Arthur Muhl as well as morning program hosted by Glenn Barndon and produced by Geoff Cannon.

Other employees include rural reporter Joanna Prendergast, news journalist Sarah Taillier, ABC Open producer Chris Lewis and cross media reporter Jane Kennedy.

John Harvey presents a Saturday breakfast show focusing on sporting news from around the region.

External links
ABC Midwest & Wheatbelt

See also
 List of radio stations in Australia

Midwest and Wheatbelt
Radio stations in Western Australia
Mid West (Western Australia)
Wheatbelt (Western Australia)